The Baffin Basin is an oceanic basin located in the middle of Baffin Bay between Baffin Island and Greenland. The basin formed as a result of seafloor spreading at the time of the opening of Baffin Bay around 56 million years ago.

References

External links

Landforms of Baffin Bay
Oceanic basins of the Atlantic Ocean